"In the Morning" is a song recorded by American entertainer Jennifer Lopez. It was written by Daniel Rondon, Jackson Foote, James Abrahart, Lopez, Jeremy Dussolliet, Johnny Simpson, Patrick Ingunza, and Tim Sommers, while the production was handled by Foote and Simpson. The song was released on November 27, 2020, by Hitco Entertainment and Nuyorican Productions.

Music video 
The music video for "In the Morning" premiered exclusively on the app Triller. It includes scenes of Lopez "wearing nothing but huge angel wings". Lopez stated that the video is "full of symbolism about a dark one-sided relationship and the realization that you can’t change anyone else (...) Grow your own wings and walk away from anyone or anything that doesn’t truly value all you have to offer."

Live performances 
Lopez performed the song live for the first time during Dick Clark's New Year's Rockin' Eve with Ryan Seacrest, the annual New Year's Eve television special broadcast by ABC from Times Square, Manhattan, on December 31, 2020.

Critical Reception
GSG Media said that the song "is a gem which sees the singer take on a new direction. It all gets underway with a sublime vocal performance from Lopez." They also added that "As the track progresses, Lopez cements her hook deep."

Track listing
Digital download and streaming
"In the Morning" – 2:47

Credits and personnel
Credits adapted from Tidal.

Daniel Rondon – songwriter
Jackson Foote – songwriter, producer
James Abrahart – songwriter
Jennifer Lopez – songwriter
Jeremy Dussolliet – songwriter
Johnny Simpson – songwriter, producer
Patrick Ingunza – songwriter
Tim Sommers – songwriter
Colin Leonard – masterer

Charts

Weekly charts

Year-end charts

Release history

References

2020 singles
2020 songs
Jennifer Lopez songs
Songs written by James Abrahart
Songs written by Jennifer Lopez
Songs written by Kinetics (rapper)
Songs written by One Love (record producer)
Nuyorican Productions singles